Kim Johnson may refer to:
 Kim Johnson (musician), American back-up vocalist 
 Kim Johnson (politician), British Labour Party MP for Liverpool Riverside since 2019
 Kim Johnson, contestant in the reality television show Survivor: Africa
 Kimmarie Johnson (born Kim Marie Johnson), American actress, model, businesswoman and beauty pageant titleholder

See also 
 Kym Johnson
 Kim Johnsson